The 1893 Calgary municipal election was scheduled for January 2, 1893 to elect a Mayor and six Councillors to sit on the ninth Calgary Town Council from January 16, 1893 to January 2, 1894.

Background
Voting rights were provided to any male, single woman, or widowed British subject over twenty-one years of age who are assessed on the last revised assessment roll with a minimum property value of $200.

The election was held under multiple non-transferable vote where each elector was able to cast a ballot for the mayor and up to four ballots for separate councillors.

There were a number of concerns during the election related to imperfect voting lists. The Calgary Weekly Herald reported a number of qualified electors were omitted from the list, and situations were wives were on the list where their husbands should have been listed. The errors were attributed to imperfect assessment rolls.

Results

Mayor

Councillors

See also
List of Calgary municipal elections

References

Sources
Frederick Hunter: THE MAYORS AND COUNCILS  OF  THE CORPORATION OF CALGARY Archived March 3, 2020

Municipal elections in Calgary
1893 elections in Canada
1890s in Calgary